Mangalapatti  is a village located in Kangeyam taluk  of Tiruppur district, Tamil Nadu, India.

Demographics 
Mangalapatti has population of 3,512 of which 1,734 are males while 1,778 are females as per report released by Census India 2011. Population of Children with age of 0-6 is 294 which is 8.37% of total population of Mangalapatti. In Mangalapatti, female sex ratio is 1025 against state average of 996. Moreover, child sex ratio in Mangalapatti is around 1100 compared to Tamil Nadu state average of 943. Literacy rate of Mangalapatti is 67.65% lower than state average of 80.09%. Male literacy is around 76.85% while female literacy rate is 58.62%.

Schools 
 Government High School, Mangalappatti

Temples 
 Kaaliamman Temple
 Eswaran Temple
 Pattatharasi Amman Temple

References 

Villages in Tiruppur district